Luton is a large town in Bedfordshire, England. 

Luton may also refer to:

Places
 Luton, East Devon, a hamlet in the parish of Broadhembury in Devon, England
 Luton, Teignbridge, a village near Newton Abbot in Devon, England
 Luton, Kent, an area of the town of Chatham, Kent, England
 Luton, Iowa, United States, a town near Sioux City
 Luton, Ontario, Canada, a town
 Luton, Philippines, a town in Province of Cebu, Central Visayas, Philippines
 London Luton Airport, in Bedfordshire, England
 Borough of Luton, a district of Bedfordshire, England
 Luton (UK Parliament constituency), Bedfordshire, England

People
 Daniel Luton (1821–1901), Canadian farmer and politician
 Jake Luton (born 1996), American football player
 Luton Shelton, football player from Jamaica playing for Sheffield United

Other uses
 GMM Luton Vehicles, former name of manufacturing plant in England
 University of Luton, merged to form the University of Bedfordshire
 Luton Aircraft Limited, a 1930s British aircraft manufacturer
 Luton body, a style of commercial vehicle body
 Luton v Lessels, a 2002 High Court of Australia case 
 Luton Town F.C., a football club based in Luton, Bedfordshire
 Luton Town L.F.C., a women's football club
 Luton system, a pairing system used in tournaments for games, especially chess

See also
Lutton (disambiguation)